The Texas A&M Aggies softball program is a college softball team that represents Texas A&M University in the Southeastern Conference in the National Collegiate Athletic Association. The team has had 9 head coaches since it started playing organized softball in the 1972–73 season. The current coach is Jo Evans, who took over the head coaching position in 1997.

Key

Coaches

Notes

References

Lists of college softball head coaches in the United States

Texas AandM Aggies softball coaches